Neto is a suffix used in Portuguese-speaking countries to distinguish a grandson from his grandfather when they have the same given name.

The following people bear the suffix Neto:

 António Agostinho Neto, a former president of Angola
 Darcy Dolce Neto, a Brazilian football (soccer) player
 Edmundo Alves de Souza Neto, a Brazilian football (soccer) player
 Ernesto Neto, a Brazilian visual artist
 Franco José Vieira Neto, Brazilian beach volleyball player
 João Cabral de Melo Neto, a Brazilian poet
 José Ferreira Neto, sports commentator and former association football player
 Luís Carlos Novo Neto, Portuguese footballer
 Michel Cury Neto, a Brazilian footballer
 Norberto Murara Neto, a Brazilian footballer
 Otacílio Mariano Neto, Brazilian footballer
 Otacilio Jales da Silva Neto, Brazilian footballer
 Raul Bragança Neto, a former prime minister of São Tomé and Príncipe
 Raulzinho Neto, Brazilian NBA player

Neto also a variant of European surname Netto.

See also
Junior (disambiguation)
Suffix to names
Portuguese name

de:Neto
es:Neto
fr:Neto
it:Neto (disambigua)
pt:Neto (desambiguação)